Clytra nigrocincta is a species of leaf beetles in the subfamily Cryptocephalinae, that can be found in eastern Turkey, Syria, Iraq, the Caucasus and in the northern part of Iran.

References

Beetles described in 1848
Beetles of Asia
Clytrini
Taxa named by Jean Théodore Lacordaire